The Bartercard Cup was a rugby league club competition in New Zealand that ran from 2000 until 2007. Bartercard Cup seasons 2003-2005 may refer to:

2003 Bartercard Cup
2004 Bartercard Cup
2005 Bartercard Cup